Phagu Chauhan (born 1 January 1948) is an Indian politician serving as the Governor of Meghalaya. He previously served as the 29th Governor of Bihar. He is a former member of 17th Legislative Assembly of Uttar Pradesh from Ghosi, a seat he won a record six times, representing various parties like Lok Dal, Bahujan Samaj Party and Bharatiya Janata Party.

Personal life
Chauhan was born on 1 January 1948 in the village of Sekhupur in Azamgarh district of present-day Uttar Pradesh to Kharpattu Chauhan. He is a graduate. Chauhan is married to Muhari Devi, with whom he has three sons and four daughters. He belongs to Noniya caste.

Political career
Chauhan started his political career in 1985 from the political party Dalit Mazdoor Kisan Party  and became first time MLA in his political career. After that he contested many Legislative Assembly (Vidhan Sabha) elections from different parties and won maximum number of times. In 2017 Uttar Pradesh Assembly Election he contested as Bharatiya Janata Party candidate from Ghosi and defeated his close contestant Abbas Ansari from Bahujan Samaj Party with a margin of 7,003 votes.

In July 2019, Chauhan was appointed the 29th Governor of Bihar.

During his tenure as Governor of Bihar and also ex-officio Chancellor of State Universities, many universities got tangled into multiple scams which came into light after Bihar Government's Special Vigilance Unit raids. One of which Magadh University's case was most peculiar as Vice Chancellor Rajendra Prasad was booked under Section 420 of IPC for ₹30 Crore fraud. His homes were raided which was first for a VC of University. Chauhan as Chancellor of the University didn't sack the VC who also hails from UP as does Chauhan which fueled some speculations. The VC went on medical leave and thus leaving the position defacto vacant. He said the vigilance raids were not good for the University as it created environment of fear. VC, Exam Controller along with other staff were brought from other Universities and given additional charge. Due to all this Magadh University's academic session suffered longest delays in recent times as multiple exams are pending. Multiple protests erupted over these issues in which effigies of the Governor were burnt which in itself is new as Governor is a respected constitutional position. Students of this University expressed their frustration to Governor Chauhan over delayed session and exams not being conducted and demanded permanent Vice Chancellor and staff or his resignation.

Posts held

See also
Uttar Pradesh Legislative Assembly

References

|-

|-

Uttar Pradesh MLAs 2017–2022
Bharatiya Janata Party politicians from Uttar Pradesh
People from Mau district
1948 births
Living people
Lok Dal politicians
Bahujan Samaj Party politicians from Uttar Pradesh
Janata Dal politicians